Open-book accounting is an extension of the principles of Open-book management to include in an organisation's accounts all those with an interest in the organisation, not merely its employees and its shareholders (including those whose shareholding is managed indirectly, for example through a mutual fund). This effectively means all members of the public.

Since almost all accounting records are now kept in electronic form, and since the computers on which they are held are universally connected, it should be possible for accounting records to be world-readable.

This is an aspiration: at present, organisations run their accounts on systems secured behind firewalls and  release of financial information by publicly quoted companies is carefully choreographed to ensure that it reaches all participants in the market equally.

Advocates of open-book accounting argue that full transparency in accounting will lead to greater accountability and will help rebuild the trust in financial capitalism that has been so badly damaged by recent events such as the collapse of Lehman Brothers, the federal rescues of AIG, Fannie Mae and Freddie Mac, and the fire-sale of Merrill Lynch to Bank of America, not to mention earlier scandals such as the collapse of Enron and Worldcom.

References

 Romano, Pietro; Formentini, Marco (2012-05-01). "Designing and implementing open book accounting in buyer–supplier dyads: A framework for supplier selection and motivation". International Journal of Production Economics. 137 (1): 68–83. doi:10.1016/j.ijpe.2012.01.013

Accounting systems